Pascal Yvan Plovie (born 7 May 1965 in Bruges) is a Belgian former footballer. Playing as a defender he represented Club Brugge K.V. and Royal Antwerp FC as well as the Belgium national football team.

External links

1965 births
Belgian footballers
Belgium international footballers
Belgian Pro League players
Club Brugge KV players
1990 FIFA World Cup players
Living people
Footballers from Bruges
Royal Antwerp F.C. players
Association football defenders